The canton of Montataire is an administrative division of the Oise department, northern France. Its borders were modified at the French canton reorganisation which came into effect in March 2015. Its seat is in Montataire.

It consists of the following communes:
 
Balagny-sur-Thérain
Blaincourt-lès-Précy
Cires-lès-Mello
Cramoisy
Foulangues
Maysel
Mello
Montataire
Précy-sur-Oise
Rousseloy
Saint-Leu-d'Esserent
Saint-Vaast-lès-Mello
Thiverny
Ully-Saint-Georges
Villers-sous-Saint-Leu

References

Cantons of Oise
Hauts-de-France region articles needing translation from French Wikipedia